Poggio Murella is a village in Tuscany, central Italy, administratively a frazione of the comune of Manciano, province of Grosseto. At the time of the 2011 census its population amounted to 287.

Geography 
Poggio Murella is about 60 km from Grosseto and 15 km from Manciano, and it is situated in the southern side of the hill ("poggio") of Poggio Capanne, in the valley of Albegna.

Poggio Murella is composed by several borgate (hamlets): Basso, Bubbolina, Greppo, Poderino, Poggetto, Poggio Sassorosso, Sellaie, Termine, Torre.

History 
The village was formerly known as Poggio di Saturnia and then as Poggio di Capanne, and it was renamed with its current name in 1927, as it became a frazione of Manciano.

Main sights 

 San Giuseppe (19th century), main parish church of the village, it was built by the will of the wealthy landowner Giuseppe Zammarchi in the late 19th century.
 Castellum Aquarum, a large Roman cistern with the interior divided into two naves with barrel vaults and covered by opus reticulatum.

References

Bibliography 
 Giovanni De Feo, Le città del tufo nella valle del Fiora. Guida ai centri etruschi e medioevali della Maremma collinare, Pitigliano, Laurum Editrice, 2005.

See also 
 Marsiliana
 Montemerano
 Poderi di Montemerano
 Poggio Capanne
 San Martino sul Fiora
 Saturnia

Frazioni of Manciano